The Arthur C. Ziemer House is a historic house in Lincoln, Nebraska. It was built in 1909-1910 for Arthur Z C. Ziemer, a railroad ticket agent, interior designer, and Christian Science healer. Ziemer first arrived in Lincoln in 1870, and he died in 1913. The house was it was designed in the Shingle style. It has been listed on the National Register of Historic Places since November 23, 1977.

References

		
National Register of Historic Places in Lincoln, Nebraska
Shingle Style architecture in Nebraska
Shingle Style houses
Houses completed in 1909